Association football, the most popular sport in Portugal, has a long and storied history in the country, following its introduction in 1875 in cities such as Funchal, Lisbon, Porto and Coimbra by English merchants and Portuguese students arriving back home from studying in England. This led to the establishment of local clubs dedicated to the practice of the sport.

Initially, football was played between neighbour clubs, but soon enough citywide and regional tournaments started to take place around the nation. Soon after the start of the 20th century, the need to establish which club was the best in Portugal culminated with the organizing of the "Campeonato de Portugal" (now known as "Taça de Portugal"), with subsequent bragging rights going mostly to clubs from Lisbon and Porto.

Portugal's top domestic league, the Primeira Liga, was founded in 1934 and is home to internationally successful clubs such as S.L. Benfica, FC Porto and Sporting CP – the "Big Three", who usually dominate the league. With a combined eleven trophies won to date, the measure of success by Portuguese clubs in international competition is as follows: four European Cup/UEFA Champions League, two UEFA Cup/UEFA Europa League, one European Cup Winners' Cup, one UEFA Intertoto Cup, one UEFA Super Cup and two Intercontinental Cup/Toyota Cup.

Despite the production of footballers such as Eusébio, Luís Figo and Cristiano Ronaldo (Ballon d'Or winners), the Portugal national team have been, for the most part, underachievers at international level when compared to their youth squads, who have won just about every European and world title available. In FIFA World Cup, Portugal's best finishes were third in 1966 and fourth in 2006. More recently, Portugal won their first major title, the UEFA Euro 2016, over hosts France. Until then, Portugal had been runners-up to Greece as hosts in 2004, and semifinalists in 1984, 2000 and 2012. In 2019, Portugal won the first edition of the UEFA Nations League, beating the Netherlands.

History

Early history

Football started to gain popularity in Portugal in the late 19th century, brought by Portuguese students who returned from England.

The first organized game in the country took place in 1875 in Camacha, Madeira, organized by Madeira-born Harry Hinton, who brought a football from England where he was studying. Popularity quickly spread across the island. Harry would go on to become honorary president of C.S. Marítimo.

The Pinto Basto brothers, Guilherme, Eduardo and Frederico, were the fundamental heads behind its spread in mainland Portugal. They had been introduced to football while studying in England at St George's College and Eduardo played a decisive role in the development of football in Portugal and particularly in Lisbon when he ordered a series of footballs from England, which he distributed to various military units, thus giving a huge boost to the practice of this sport. On the other hand, Guilherme organized an exhibition in Cascais in October 1888, the first known football match in mainland Portugal, which was a rehearsal for a more serious and competitive match organized three months later, on 22 January 1889, held in Lisbon where today's Campo Pequeno bullring is located. It was contested between the Portuguese noblemen, who were made up of the best players from the 1888 game, and a group of English workers living in Lisboa, who were made up of employees of Cabo Submarino, Casa Graham and other English houses installed in Lisbon. Consequently, football started attracting the attention of high society, distinguished by the Luso-British rivalry.

The first football club to have been founded in Portugal was Club Lisbonense in 1892, which was founded by the Pinto Basto brothers together with other football pioneers in the city such as the Vilar brothers (Carlos and Afonso) and Paiva Raposo. Club Lisbonense played its first games against the English from Carcavelos, who would eventually organize themselves into a Club, the Carcavelos Club. These two groups were the first promoters of football in Lisbon, and football began taking root in the city, especially among the youth, thus the game soon reached colleges and so, Lisbonense and Carcavelos are joined by a team made up of students from Colégio Villar. The three groups began to play several matches against each other and were eventually joined by a team of Braço de Prata, which included several Englishmen and build-up an Invictus status. However, a certain Clube de Lisboa committed the feat of beating the "invincible" team of Braço de Prata by 2–0 in 1903. In April 1893, the Estrela Foot-Ball Club appears, captained by Commander Joaquim Costa.

Then came the presentation of a football team from the Club Tauromático Group, which again included the three brothers Pinto Basto (Guilherme, Eduardo, and Frederico), among others, such as Hugo O'Neil, who had played in the 1888 game. At the end of January 1893, however, the Group of Club Tauromático becomes the Grupo dos Irmãos Pinto Basto. Moreover, the Pinto Basto brothers, in addition to being part of and playing for several clubs already, had their own group, the "Foot-Ball Club Swifts", where Guilherme was the captain and his brother Eduardo was the sub-captain.

On 28 September 1893, the Oporto Cricket Club (currently known as FC Porto) was organized in Porto, which was the first football club to be established in the North of the country. In February 1894, the students of Casa Pia in Lisbon organize their football group. Other clubs who emerged around this time were Foot-Ball Académico, in 1895, and Clube de Campo de Ourique, in 1896. This was followed by a period of some lack of interest in football (1896–99), due to the lack of fields, goals, equipment, and the rudeness of its practice, with the local press even starting to call it the "kickback" game. During this period it was Casa Pia, which emerged in 1892, who came to play the most important role in the expansion and progress of football.

The first cup match in the country was held in Porto on 2 March 1894, and it was attended by King Carlos and Queen Amelia. This is possibly the first match in which extra time was played as the royal couple arrived too late to see the first half and the Queen demanded that the game continue after the end, because she was enjoying it so much.

By century's end, associations such as Clube Lisbonense, Carcavelos Sport Club, Braço de Prata, Real Ginásio Clube Português, Estrela Futebol Clube, Futebol Académico, Campo de Ourique, Oporto Cricket, and Sport Clube Vianense had been founded.

The failed attempts to reorganize Club Lisbonense (1892) and Grupo Estrela (1893) paved the way for the appearance of the Club Internacional de Foot-Ball (CIF) on 8 December 1902, which was the natural extension of the Grupo dos Irmãos Pinto Basto and the Foot-Ball Club Swits. CIF was the first Portuguese club to play abroad, defeating Madrid Fútbol Clube in 1907 in Madrid.

On 31 March 1914, the three regional associations that existed in Portugal (Lisbon, Portalegre, and Porto) merged to create a national association called a União Portuguesa de Futebol, the predecessor of the current national association, the Portuguese Football Federation, which was formed on 28 May 1926.

Golden age
The Portuguese were one of the first Europeans to explore Africa. They have influenced a lot of their former colonies, notably in the realm of football. This was mostly due to the concept of Lusotropicalism, which became popularized during the tenure of António Salazar. The Portuguese enthusiasm for football led to the spread of the sport into its former overseas colonies of Angola, Mozambique, Guiné-Bissau, Cape Verde, S. Tomé and Principe, Goa, Macau, and East-Timor. Eventually, Portugal would attempt to integrate their colonies, which would lead to them having many African players in the teams on the mainland. Introduced in the colonies as early as the 19th century, football became increasingly. By the 1950s many Africans would support football teams on the mainland. The popularity of the game in the colonies also meant that there were many people who wanted to play it professionally. Many top players from the former colonies have represented Portugal at the international level, as well as playing for many clubs in the various tiers of the national and international leagues, most notably in the past the likes of Fernando Peyroteo, Matateu, Hilário, Costa Pereira, Coluna, Eusébio, and Abel Xavier.

Recent history

Club football
The main domestic football competition is the Primeira Liga, and the dominant Portuguese teams are S.L. Benfica, FC Porto and Sporting CP, which form the "Big Three" clubs in Portugal. Other clubs, such as C.F. Os Belenenses, Boavista FC, Vitória S.C., and S.C. Braga, have been contenders for the coveted place of fourth biggest club.

One of the oldest clubs still in existence is Académica de Coimbra, founded in 1887. Other historical club is Boavista F.C., founded in 1903. S.L. Benfica was founded in 1904 as Sport Lisboa, who merged with Grupo Sport Benfica in 1908. Sporting CP was founded in 1906. F.C. Porto was founded in 1906 and changed its foundation year to 1893 in the 1980s. Leixões S.C. was founded in 1907; Vitória F.C., C.S. Marítimo, C.D. Nacional in 1910; S.C. Olhanense in 1912; S.C. Espinho, Portimonense S.C. and Académico de Viseu F.C. in 1914; C.F. Os Belenenses in 1919. The success of these earlier clubs inspired the rapid spread of football to all corners of Portugal.

After the end of World War I, the sprouting of football clubs all over the country gained momentum and, in the 1920s, S.C. Braga, Vitória S.C., Gil Vicente F.C. and S.C. Beira Mar among many others, were founded, further asserting the popularity of the sport wherever it was played, with stadiums filled to maximum capacity. By then, the local talent always wanting to better the opposition further improved the quality of the players' training and tactical strategy awareness by investing and importing top foreign coaching and managerial staff from abroad, resulting in the refinement and improvement of the local game quality being able to stand up to top international levels. Some early clubs from the late 1800s and early 1900s, like Carcavelinhos, for example, did not survive and either merged with other clubs or became extinct altogether.

At European level, before the advent of UEFA-sanctioned competitions, such as the European Cup, the Inter-Cities Fairs Cup, and the European Cup Winners' Cup/UEFA Cup Winners' Cup, which became regularly scheduled competitions, Benfica won the now defunct Latin Cup, a competition organized annually by the football associations of France, Italy, Portugal, and Spain, from the late 1940s to the mid-1950s, involving those nations' top teams.

List of teams (2022–23 season)

List of teams by major honours
Below is listed every team to have won any of the major domestic competitions (organized by LPFP and FPF) and international trophies organized by UEFA and FIFA. (Thus, Benfica's Latin Cup is not included.)

Bold denotes club with the most number of trophies in specified category.

National team

On 26 May 2010, Portugal attained the third place in the FIFA World Ranking, their highest ever. They repeated this feat in 2012, 2014, 2017 and 2018. Their lowest rank was 43rd overall in 1998. In recent years, Portugal has consistently maintained a top 10 and, sometimes, a top 5 FIFA world rank position.

In 2004 Portugal hosted UEFA Euro and reached its final but were beaten by Greece 1–0. In worldwide terms, Portugal have reached the semi-finals of the FIFA World Cup twice: in the 1966 edition, where Eusébio was the top scorer with nine goals, and in the 2006 edition, where the team led by captain Luís Figo marked the World Cup debut of Cristiano Ronaldo.

Following the retirement of all players from its "golden generation", Portugal, led by manager Fernando Santos, won Euro 2016, defeating hosts France 1–0 in the final. In 2019, Portugal won the 2018–19 UEFA Nations League by defeating Netherlands 1–0 in the final.

Portugal also participates to the Lusofonia Games and takes part in its football tournaments. In 2014, Portugal was one of the eight nations to take part in the first Unity World Cup.

Notes

References